Valley View Independent School District may refer to:

 Valley View Independent School District (Cooke County, Texas)
 Valley View Independent School District (Hidalgo County, Texas)